This list covers the many types of vampires or vampire-like legendary creatures of global folklore. It does not include any vampire that originates in a work of fiction.

A
 Abchanchu (Bolivia)
 Abere (Melanesia)
 Abhartach (Ireland) 
 Adéla (Bohemia)
 Adze (Ghana)
 Alp (Germany) – Variations throughout the world.
 Andreea Trifas (Romania)
 Asiel Torres (Puerto Rico)
 Aniukha (Mongolia, China)
 Arnold Paole (Serbia)
 Asanbosam (Ashanti people)
 Asema (Surinam)
 Asiman (Ashanti people)
 Aswang (Philippines)
 Aufhocker (Germany)
 Azeman (Ashanti people)

B
 Badmaarag (Mongolia)
 also called Baadai
 Baital (India) – Variations: Baitala, Baitel, Baitol, Bay Valley, Katakhanoso, Vetal, Vetala
 Bajang (Malaysia)
 Baka (Haitian Vodou) – Variant: Benin
 Bantu (India) – There are three main kinds of this vampire including:
 Bantu Dodong
 Bantu Parl
 Bantu Saburo
 Baobhan Sith (Highlands of Scotland)
 Berbalang (Philippines)
 The Berwick Vampire (England)
 Bezkost (Slavic)
 Bhayangkara (Tibet)
 Bhūta (India)
 Bibi (the Balkans)
 The Blow Vampire (1706 Kadam, Bohemia)
 Blutsauger (Germany) – Variant: Blutsäuger
 Boo Hag (America)
 Boraro – Colombian folklore 
 Brahmaparush (India)
 Breslan Vampire (17th Century Breslau, Poland)
 Bruja (Spain and Central America)
 Bruxa (Portugal) –  Males being called Bruxo
 the Buckinghamshire Vampire (1196 Buckinghamshire, England)
 Burach Bhadi (Scotland)

C 
 Cadaver Sanguins – England
 Callicantzaro – Greece
 Camazotz – Maya Mythology
 Canchus – Peru also spelled:
 Pumapmicuc
 Capelobo – Brazilian mythology
 Cat Marinescu – Romanian
 Catacano – Crete
 also spelled Kathakano
 Cihuateteo – Aztec Mythology
 Chedipe – India
 Children of Judas – Bulgaria and Serbia
 Chonchon – Latin America
 Chordewa – Bengal
 Chupacabra – Originated in Puerto Rico; subsequent reports (some erroneous) in Brazil, Chile, Mexico, The United States of America
 Churel – India
 also spelled Churail
 Cihuacoatl – Aztec
 Cihuateteo – Mexico
 Croglin Grange, The Vampire of – Cumberland, England

D
 Dachnavar – Armenia with the following spelling variations:
 Dakhanavar
 Dala-Kumara Yaka – Sri Lanka
 Danag – Philippines
 Danava
 Dearg-due (Ireland) (dubious) – variations: Deamhain Fhola, Deamhan Fola, Dearg-Dililat, Dearg-Diulai, Dearg-dul, Dearg Dulai, Derrick-Daily, Headless Coach (“Coach a Bower”), Marbh Bheo (“night walking dead”) 
 Dhampire (Slovakia) with the following variations in spelling:
 Dhampyr
 Dhampiresa
 Dampyr
 Dila – Philippines
 Djadadjii – Bulgaria<this is a vampire hunter>
 Doppelsauger – Germany also spelled:
 Dubblesuger or Dubbelsügger
 Draugr – Norse Variations: Aptgangr (“one who walks after death”), Aptrgangr, Barrow Dweller, Gronnskjegg, Haubui, Haugbui (“Sleeper in the Mound”) Has two main versions land and sea.

E
 Edimmu – Sumer \ Iraq with the following spelling variation:
 Ekimmu
 Empusa – Ancient Greece which is also called:
 Mormolykiai
 Empusas
 Eretik – Russia
 Estrie – Jewish Tradition

F
 Fifollet – United States (Louisiana) also spelled:
 Feu Follet

G
 Gashadokuro – Japan
 Glaistig (Scotland)
 Garkain (Australia)
 Jure Grando (Croatia) first real person described as a vampire in historical records
 Ghoul (Arabic lore) – "The Arabic stories of the ghole spread east and were adopted by the people of the Orient, where it evolved as a type of vampiric spirit called a ghoul." Variants: Alqul (Arabia), Aluga (Bible; Proverbs 30:15), Balbal (Tagbanua, Philippines), Ghoulas (Algeria); Katacan (Sri Lanka).

H
 Hannya – Japan
 Haubui – Norwegian
 Haidam Vampire – Romania (Hungary, before 1918)
 The Highgate Vampire – Highgate Cemetery England
 Hisi-Hsua-Kuei – China
 Hi'ilei – Hawaii
 hooh-strah-dooh – Wyandot – North America
 Hone-onna- Japan
 Hupia – Taíno with the spelling variations:
 opia
 opi'a
 op'a
 operi'to

I
 Impundulu (South Africa)
 plural iimpundulu
 also called ishologu
 Incubus/Succubus (Medieval Europe)
 Inovercy (Russia)
 Iso-onna – Japan

J

 Jenglot – Indonesian and Malaysian
 Jiangshi – China, also under the names of:
 Kiang shi
 Kuang shi
 Chang Kuei
 Cương Thi
 Jaques Saint Germain - United States, Louisiana
 Jigarkhwar – India
 also spelled Jigarkhor
 Joint-eater – Irish
 also called Alp-luachra
 Jubokko – Japan
 Jure Grando – Croatia

K
 K'uei – China
 Kalu-Kumara Yaka – Sri Lanka
 Kappa 河童  – Japan with the following spelling variations:
 Gataro 川太郎
 Kawako 川子
 Kasha – Japan
 Kathakano – Crete
 Kichkandi – Nepal
 Kephn – Burma
 Kranokolaptes - Greece
 Kravopiec – Bulgarian
 Kudlak – Czechoslovakia
 Kumiho – Korea
 Kukudhi – Albania
 Kyuuketsuki 吸血鬼 – Japan
 karalanos – Egypt

L
 Laistrygones – Ancient Greece, also under the names of:
 Laestrygones
 Laistrygonians
 Laestrygonians
 La Llorona – Central America and the United States
 Lamashtu –  Mesopotamia
 Lamia – Libya
 Lampire – Bosnia
 Langsuir – Malaysia, also under the names of:
 Langsuyar
 Pontianak
 Kuntilanak
 Leanashe – Ireland (dubious)
 Lemures – Ancient Rome
 Leyak – Indonesia
 Liebava – Moravia
 Lidérc – Hungary
 Lilith לִּילִית – Sumer \ Iraq, with another name of:
 Lilitu
 Loango – Ashanti and Asanbosam people, Africa
 Lobisomem – South America\Brazil
 Loogaroo – Caribbean Islands \ Mauritius
 Lugat – Albania, also under the name of:
 Liogat
 Kukuthi

M
 Mamba Mutu - Democratic Republic of the Congo
 Manananggal – Philippines also spelled:
 Tanggal
 Mandurugo – Philippines
 Mara – Slavonic also spelled:
 Mora
 Mati-Anak – Malaysia also spelled:
 Pontianak
 The Melrose Vampire – Melrose Abby, Scotland
 Melusine – France
 The Mikonos Vampire – Greece 1702
 Mmbyu – India also spelled or an early form of:
 Pocu Pati
 Mosquito Man - Native American, Pacific 
Northwest
 Moskitto - North America
 Mullo – Romani the plural being Mulé, with the following spelling variation:
 Mullo
 Muroni – Romania
 Mjertovjec – Belarus
 Meçkey/Meçik – Turkic peoples

N
 Nachzehrer – Germany with the following possible spelling variations:
 Neuntöter
 Nachtöter
 Nelapsi – Slovakia
 Nora – Hungary
 Nukekubi – Japan
 Nure-onna – Japan

O
 Obayifo – Ashanti
 Obur – Bulgaria
 Ohyn – Poland
 Ol' Higue – Jamaica
 Opyrb – Slavic with the following spelling variation:
 Opirb

P
 Pacu Pati – India
 Palis - Iran
 Papinijuwari – Australia
 Pelesit – Malaysia
 Penanggal – Malaysia
 Petar Blagojevich – Serbia
 Peuchen – Chile
 Pricolici - Romania
 Pichal Peri – India
 Pichas – Nepal
 Pishtaco – South America, Peru
 Pontianak – Malaysia

R
 Rakshasa – India
 Raktha pisachi – India
 Ramanga – Madagascar
 Revenants – England
 Richmond Vampire – Richmond, Virginia, USA
 Riri Yaka – Sri Lanka
 Ruza Vlajna – Serbia

S
 Sava Savanović – Serbia
 Sekhmet - Egypt
 Shtriga – Albania
 Sigbin – Philippines
 Soucouyant – Trinidadian Guadeloupean it has the spelling variation:
 Stregoni benefici – Italy
 Soucriant
 Strigoi – Romania with the following variations:
 Strigoaica
 Moroi
 Strix – Ancient Rome with the following spelling variations:
 Striga
 Stirge
 Strige
 Strzyga – Slavic
 Suangi – New Guinea
 Sukuyan – Caribbean
 Succubus – Judeo-Christian
 Sybaris – Greece

T
 Talamaur – Australia
 Thayé – Burma with the spelling variation:
 Tasei
 Tlahuelpuchi – Mexico with the following spelling variation:
 Tlaciques

U
 Ubour – Bulgaria
 Upier – Poland
 Vjesci (pronounced as "vyeskee")
 Njetop (pronounced as "nyetop")
 Wupji (pronounces as "woopyee")
 Ohyn
 Upír – Slovakia
 Upir – Ukraine though could be linked to:
 Upyr – Russia
 Uruku – Mesopotamia
 Ustrel – Bulgaria
 Utukku – Iraq

V
 Vampire pumpkins and watermelons (Balkan)
 vampiros (Brazil and Portugal)
 Vapir (Bulgaria)
 Vârcolac (Romania) – variations: Pricolici and Varcolaci
 Vǎrkolak (Bulgaria)
 Vendalla (Ethiopia)
 Vetalas (India)
 Vhlk'h dlaka (Greece)
 Vipir
 Vjesci (Poland)
 Opji
 Wupji
 Vampir (Serbia, Slovenia, Yugoslavia, Bosnia and Croatia)
 Vlkodlak (Siberia) – Variants:  Volkodlak, Volkoslak
 Vrykolakas βρυκόλακας (Greece) – variation: Vorvolakas
 Vrykolatios (Santorini)

W
 Wak Wak (Philippines)
 Wampir (Poland)
 Wurdulac (Russia) has a spelling variation:
 Verdilak

X

Y
 Yama – Tibet, Nepal and Mongolia
 Yara-ma-yha-who – Australia
 Yaka – Sri Lanka
 Yaksha – Sri Lanka, India
 Yuki-onna - Japan

Z
 Zaloznye Pokojniki – Russia
 Zorfabio – New Zealand
 Zaolas – Brazil

See also
 Dhampir
 List of dhampirs
 List of vampires

References

Bibliography 
 
 Spence, Lewis (1960) An Encyclopaedia of Occultism University Books Inc. New Hyde Park, New York
 The Vampire Watchers Handbook by "Constantine Gregory" and Craig Glenday, 2003 St. Martin's Press, New York, pp. 62–63
 Mysteries of Mind Space and Time, The Unexplained series 1992 Orbis Publishing Limited, Westport, Connecticut, po. 150–151
 A World of Vampires, documentary special, from the Two-Disk Special Edition Lost Boys DVD
 The Vampire Book by J. Gordon Melton
 The Vampire Encyclopedia by Matthew Bunson
 Vampire Universe by Johnathan Maberry
 Vampires by Leonard R. N. Ashley

folklore and mythology
vampires